Osvaldir Araújo Euzébio (born 15 May 1987), simply known as Osvaldir, is a Brazilian footballer who plays for Villa Nova as a right back.

Club career
Born in Ipatinga, Minas Gerais, Osvaldir made his senior debuts with URT in 2007. He rarely settled with a club in the following years, representing Formiga, Funorte, Villa Nova, América-TO (two stints), Linense, Ipatinga, Oeste, Marcílio Dias, Concórdia, Araxá, CAP Uberlândia, Campinense (two stints), Madureira, Democrata-GV and Portuguesa.

References

External links

1987 births
Living people
Sportspeople from Minas Gerais
Brazilian footballers
Association football defenders
Campeonato Brasileiro Série C players
Campeonato Brasileiro Série D players
União Recreativa dos Trabalhadores players
Villa Nova Atlético Clube players
Clube Atlético Linense players
Ipatinga Futebol Clube players
Oeste Futebol Clube players
Clube Náutico Marcílio Dias players
Campinense Clube players
Madureira Esporte Clube players
Esporte Clube Democrata players
Associação Portuguesa de Desportos players
Nacional Futebol Clube players
Clube do Remo players